Sepet is a 2005 Malaysian teen romantic comedy-drama film set in Ipoh, Malaysia. Directed by Yasmin Ahmad, it tells a tale of a love that blooms between a Chinese boy and a Malay girl. Sepet is a Malay word which, in this context, refers to the 'slit eyes' of the Chinese.

Plot

A 19-year-old Ah Loong (who also called himself "Jason") is in charge of a stall selling unlicensed VCDs. Contrary to the stereotype of his social standing, Ah Loong is an incurable romantic with an unlikely hobby: He loves to read and write poetry. Quite content with being the Romeo of the slums, Ah Loong's life takes a sudden turn one day when a Malay schoolgirl, Orked, arrives at his stall while looking for films starring her favourite actor Takeshi Kaneshiro. Love blossoms between Orked and Ah Loong, although there are social and racial pressures that stand in their way.

In the end, Ah Loong is involved in a motor vehicle accident while Orked is going to England to pursue her studies. It is not clear if he lived or died until the sequel, Gubra which shows that Jason died. After the credits finish rolling however, Orked is shown wearing a wedding ring sleeping beside Jason, who also has a wedding ring. In Mukhsin, Jason and the adult Orked are shown to be living together. However, the adult Orked is not called by her name in this scene as the young Orked is.

Cast
 Choo Seong Ng as Jason aka Ah Loong
 Sharifah Amani as Orked
 Linus Chung as Keong
 Mei Ling Tan as Mah, Ah Loong's mother
 Ida Nerina as Mak, Orked's mother
 Harith Iskander as Abah, Orked's father
 Adibah Noor as Kak Yam
 Kar Hoong Thor as Pah, Ah Loong's father
 Zehan Marissa as Lin

Awards

Sequels
The sequel to Sepet, called Gubra, was filmed in Ipoh, Malaysia and released in 2006. The third movie in Yasmin Ahmad's Orked trilogy is a prequel to both Sepet and Gubra, titled Mukhsin.

Adaptations
Theatre company Liver & Lung debuted a musical adaptation of Sepet in September 2019. Shafeeq Shajahan directed the adaptation, with music and lyrics by Shajahan and Badrish. The adaptation was a critical success, winning Best Direction at the BOH Cameronian Arts Awards in 2020. Joshua Anthony Gui and Badrika Baluch played the roles of Jason and Orked in the adaptation, receiving positive reviews. Theatre critic website Critic Republic wrote that the musical had an "unexpected quality, where audiences all cried, laughed and smiled together."

Songs from the musical were released on Spotify in July 2021, to celebrate Yasmin Ahmad's 12 year death anniversary.

References

External links 
 Official site
 

2004 films
Cantonese-language Malaysian films
2000s romantic comedy-drama films
2000s English-language films
Films directed by Yasmin Ahmad
Hokkien-language films
Malay-language films
2000s Mandarin-language films
Malaysian romantic comedy-drama films
Films about interracial romance
Films set in Malaysia
Chinese-language Malaysian films
Films with screenplays by Yasmin Ahmad
2004 comedy films
2004 drama films
2004 multilingual films
Malaysian multilingual films